Adrian Antonio Gardner (born 24 June 1983) is an English former professional rugby league footballer, who spent the vast majority of his career with St Helens in the Super League. He was an England and Great Britain representative er.

Early and personal life

Born in Barrow-in-Furness, Gardner is the elder brother of ex-Salford City Reds , Mat Gardner. He is of Brazilian descent through his mother.
Gardner attended St. Bernard's Catholic High School in Barrow.

Career

He began his career at his home town club Barrow Raiders, and after 11-years at St. Helens, ended his playing days with a season loan move to the Hull Kingston Rovers. 

Gardner made his Super League début in a match against the London Broncos on 28 March 2002, which St. Helens lost. Having won Super League VI, St. Helens contested the 2003 World Club Challenge against 2002 NRL Premiers, the Sydney Roosters. Gardner played on the wing in Saints' 38–0 loss. He established himself as a first team regular in 2003 and has now appeared 281 times for St Helens, scoring 167 tries. Gardner played for St Helens on the wing in their 2006 Challenge Cup Final victory against Huddersfield Giants. Gardner also finished the 2006 season as St. Helens leading try scorer with 29 tries in all competitions.

Gardner was named in the Great Britain training squad throughout 2006. He scored on his international début in XXXX Test match against New Zealand on 27 June 2006.

St. Helens reached the 2006 Super League Grand final to be contested against Hull FC, and Gardner played on the wing and scored a try in Saints' 26–4 victory. He was a surprise omission from the Great Britain squad for the 2006 Tri-nations.
As 2006 Super League champions, St Helens faced 2006 NRL Premiers the Brisbane Broncos in the 2007 World Club Challenge. Gardner played on the wing and scored two tries in Saints' 18–14 victory.

Gardner was selected in June 2007 in a young Great Britain team named by new coach Tony Smith for their match against France at Headingley. On 25 August, he scored two tries for St. Helens at Wembley Stadium to help Saints win their 11th Challenge Cup.

He was named in the Super League Dream Team for 2008's Super League XIII season.

He played in the 2008 Super League Grand Final defeat by Leeds.

Gardner was selected for the England squad to compete in the 2008 Rugby League World Cup tournament in Australia. Group A's first match against Papua New Guinea he played on the wing and scored two tries in England's victory.

He played in the 2009 Super League Grand Final defeat by the Leeds Rhinos at Old Trafford.

In the 2014 season, Ade Gardner played on loan at Hull KR, scoring 8 tries in 18 appearances. On 17 May at the Etihad Stadium during the 2014 Magic Weekend, he scored 2 tries in Hull KR's 38–24 victory against Hull.
8 days later at KCOM Craven Park, he scored another 2 tries in Hull KR's 48–16 victory over the London Broncos.

Retirement

In November 2014, after returning to St Helens, Ade Gardner announced his retirement from the sport after 15 years as a professional. It had been Gardner's intention to play on till 2015, but accepted an offer to join Saints' backroom staff instead, as an Assistant Strength and Conditioning Coach.

References

External links

St Helens profile
Profile at saints.org.uk
22. ADE GARDNER
INTERVIEW: Ade Gardner reflects on his many highs and a few lows as a player
Match preview: Hull KR v Huddersfield Giants

1983 births
Living people
Barrow Raiders players
Cumbria rugby league team players
England Knights national rugby league team players
England national rugby league team players
English people of Brazilian descent
English rugby league players
Great Britain national rugby league team players
Hull Kingston Rovers players
Rugby league wingers
Rugby league players from Barrow-in-Furness
St Helens R.F.C. players
Whitehaven R.L.F.C. players